Piedades is a district of the Santa Ana canton, in the San José province of Costa Rica.

Geography 
Piedades has an area of  km² and an elevation of  metres.

Locations
Its neighborhoods are:
 Caraña
 Cebadilla
 Finquitas
 Montaña del Sol
 Rincón San Marcos
 Triunfo.

Demographics 

For the 2011 census, Piedades had a population of  inhabitants.

Transportation

Road transportation 
The district is covered by the following road routes:
 National Route 22
 National Route 27
 National Route 121

References 

Districts of San José Province
Populated places in San José Province